Jiang Shuai (born June 7, 1982 in Qingdao, Shandong) is a female Chinese football player who competed for the national team in the 2008 Summer Olympics. Her position is that of defender.

Major performances

2002 Asian Youth Championship - 3rd
2005 World University Games - 2nd
2005 National Games - 4th
2007 CFA Cup - 1st
2008 Asian Cup - 2nd

References
http://2008teamchina.olympic.cn/index.php/personview/personsen/2721 
https://web.archive.org/web/20080810232038/http://results.beijing2008.cn/WRM/ENG/BIO/Athlete/1/236631.shtml

1982 births
Living people
Chinese women's footballers
Footballers at the 2008 Summer Olympics
Olympic footballers of China
Footballers from Qingdao
China women's international footballers
Women's association football defenders